Suhail TV (Arabic:قناة سهيل الفضائية)  is Yemeni television station affiliated with the Al-Islah party. It started broadcasting in 2009 from Sanaa, but moved abroad after being raided by the Houthis.

References

External links 

 

Television in Yemen
Television stations in Yemen
Television channels and stations established in 2009